The 2016 European Rally Championship was the 64th season of the FIA European Rally Championship, the European continental championship series in rallying. The season was also the fourth following the merge between the European Rally Championship and the Intercontinental Rally Challenge.

Calendar

The calendar for the 2016 season featured ten rallies.

Notes:
 – Season opener Rally Liepāja–Ventspils was cancelled due to warm temperatures and lack of snow. It was later moved to September and was held as gravel rally.

Entry list

ERC

ERC-2

ERC-3

ERC Junior

Ladies Trophy

Results

Championship standings

Points Systems

ERC, ERC-2, ERC-3 and ERC Junior
 For both the Drivers' and Teams' championships of the ERC, ERC-2 and ERC-3, only the best seven results will be retained by each driver or team.
 For both the Drivers' and Teams' championships of the ERC Junior, only the best four results will be retained by each driver or team.
 Points for final position are awarded as in following table:

 Bonus points awarded for position in each Leg

Ladies Trophy
 For the Drivers' championship, only the best four results will be retained by each driver.
 Points for final position are awarded as in following table

Drivers' Championships

ERC

ERC-2

ERC-3

Ladies Trophy

ERC Junior

Teams' Championships

ERC

ERC-2

ERC-3

External links
 

 
European Rally Championship
Rally Championship
European Rally Championship seasons